Disco interacting protein 2 homolog C is a protein that in humans is encoded by the DIP2C gene.

Function

This gene encodes a member of the disco-interacting protein homolog 2 family. The protein shares strong similarity with a Drosophila protein which interacts with the transcription factor disco and is expressed in the nervous system. [provided by RefSeq, Oct 2008].

References

Further reading